Perryville is a city in Perry County, Missouri, United States. The population was 8,555 at the 2020 United States census. Perryville is the county seat of Perry County.

History
Perryville was selected the county seat of Perry County by Robert T. Brown, Joseph Tucker, and Thomas Riney, who had been appointed to select the seat of justice. In 1821, Bernard Layton deeded  to the commissioners in exchange for one town lot. Fifty-three of the 99 town lots were sold for $1,486.25, which was used to build the first courthouse. The current courthouse is the third such structure. It was built in 1904 at a cost of $30,000. Perryville and Perry County were named for Commodore Oliver Hazard Perry, Naval hero of the War of 1812.

An early store in Perryville was a log structure built by Jean Ferdinand Rozier on the north side of the square. An extant two-story brick building was built in 1830. The upper story serves as the first town hall.  Perryville was first incorporated in 1837, but the incorporation was allowed to lapse.

As both merchandisers and consumers grew in sophistication, so did the types of establishments in the county. Built in 1843, the Hoose Hotel, often called the "white house", was a prominent structure in early commercial days. The Hoose Hotel served as a hotel, a brewery and an auction block.

In 1856, the town was again incorporated and by 1874 it had its first fire engine. Fourth Class City status was attained in 1879 and the following year Charles A. Weber was elected its first mayor. With the building of the Chester, Perryville and Ste. Genevieve Railway, prosperity came.

Largely because of its role as the seat of county government and because of its central location, Perryville began to develop as the major commercial and service center in Perry County. The population increased from 897 in 1890 to 1275 in 1900.  Telephone service started in 1893.

2017 tornado

On February 28, 2017, an EF4 tornado tore through Perryville, causing widespread EF3 and some EF4 damage in and around the city. One person was killed.

Geography
Perryville is located in central Perry County approximately seven miles from the Mississippi River. Cinque Hommes Creek flows past the south side of the city. I-55 and U.S. Route 61 pass on the west and east sides of the city respectively.

Climate

Demographics

2010 census
As of the census of 2010, there were 8,225 people, 3,288 households, and 2,078 families living in the city. The racial makeup of the city was 95.33% White, 0.75% Black or African American, 0.39% Native American, 0.90% Asian, 0.07% Native Hawaiian or Pacific Islander, 1.28% from other races, and 1.28% from two or more races. Hispanic or Latino of any race were 2.69% of the population.

There were 3,288 households, of which 33.3% had children under the age of 18 living with them, 45.5% were married couples living together, 12.3% had a female householder with no husband present, 5.4% had a male householder with no wife present, and 36.8% were non-families. 31.1% of all households were made up of individuals, and 14.4% had someone living alone who was 65 years of age or older. The average household size was 2.42 and the average family size was 3.00.

The median age in the city was 36.5 years. 25.4% of residents were under the age of 18; 8.4% were between the ages of 18 and 24; 25.6% were from 25 to 44; 22.9% were from 45 to 64; and 17.7% were 65 years of age or older. The gender makeup of the city was 47.7% male and 52.3% female.

2000 census
As of the census of 2000, there were 7,667 people, 3,031 households, and 1,991 families living in the city. The population density was 1,010.3 people per square mile (390.0/km). There were 3,284 housing units at an average density of 432.7 per square mile (167.1/km). The racial makeup of the city was 97.47% White, 1.32% Asian, 0.25% African American, 0.17% Native American, 0.01% Pacific Islander, 0.16% from other races, and 0.63% from two or more races. Hispanic or Latino of any race were 0.70% of the population.

There were 3,031 households, out of which 31.7% had children under the age of 18 living with them, 51.4% were married couples living together, 11.2% had a female householder with no husband present, and 34.3% were non-families. 30.4% of all households were made up of individuals, and 15.6% had someone living alone who was 65 years of age or older. The average household size was 2.41 and the average family size was 3.00.

In the city the population was spread out, with 24.6% under the age of 18, 9.2% from 18 to 24, 28.2% from 25 to 44, 18.5% from 45 to 64, and 19.5% who were 65 years of age or older. The median age was 37 years. For every 100 females there were 89.7 males. For every 100 females age 18 and over, there were 86.9 males.

The median income for a household in the city was $33,934, and the median income for a family was $43,072. Males had a median income of $27,115 versus $19,736 for females. The per capita income for the city was $16,630. About 5.9% of families and 11.0% of the population were below the poverty line, including 10.6% of those under age 18 and 15.9% of those age 65 or over.

Economy
Two of the largest employers in the city are TG Missouri, a division of Toyoda Gosei, and Gilster-Mary Lee.

Manufacturers in Perryville include:
 Gilster-Mary Lee Corporation, which has as  baking mix plant and a  breakfast cereal plant.  Also in the Perryville area are 
Sabreliner Corporation, a company which provides maintenance and overhauling for both military and business jet aircraft engines;
Seguin Moreau, a French wine barrel manufacturer, that mills barrel staves and heads from Perry County's white oak forests to supply its cooperage in Napa, California. The cooperage uses the wood it gets from Perry County to produce American oak wine barrels for the international wine industry; and
TG Missouri Corporation, a subsidiary of the Japanese company Toyoda Gosei, manufactures airbags, steering wheels and interior trim pieces for automobile manufacturers, most notably Toyota.
 BBL Buildings and Components and Stark Truss, both of whom manufacture building trusses for commercial and residential construction;
Bierk Farms Gravel Company, who screens and sells creek gravel in various sizes.

Arts and culture

Festivals
Two festivals are held annually in Perryville, Mayfest which is held on the courthouse square in May, and the St. Vincent de Paul Seminary Picnic which is held on the seminary fairgrounds each August.

Historic sites

Three sites listed on the National Register of Historic Places are located in Perryville, including the Doerr–Brown House, St. Mary's of the Barrens Catholic Church, and the Shelby–Nicholson–Schindler House.

Churches
Perryville is home to a number of churches, of which three of the largest churches are St. Vincent's de Paul Roman Catholic Church, St. Mary's of the Barrens Roman Catholic Church, Immanuel Lutheran Church, the First Presbyterian Church, First Baptist Church, Calvary Baptist Church, United Methodist Church, Agape Christian Assembly of God Church, First Assembly of God Church, Christ of Christ.

Parks and recreation
The Perry Park Center, located in the city park, features an aquatics center, gymnasium, performing arts center, movie theatre, library, and sports facilities.

Government
Perryville has a mayor/city council form of government. The mayor is Larry Riney. The city council consists of six aldermen, two from each of three wards. Each is elected for two-year terms.

Education
Perryville is served by Perry County School District No. 32 (PK-12) as well as two private parochial school systems: St. Vincent dePaul Catholic School (including St. Vincent High School) and Immanuel Lutheran School (PK-8).

Perryville has a public library, a branch of the Riverside Regional Library.

Infrastructure
The 880th Engineer Team (HAUL) of the Missouri Army National Guard is based in Perryville.

Perry County Memorial Hospital is the health provider for the city and county.

Notable people
 Steve Bieser, Major League Baseball player and college baseball coach
 Arthur D. Bond, father of former governor Kit Bond, a PHS graduate who also played football at the University of Missouri
 Bill Cissell, Major League Baseball player
 Chris Janson, Country singer
 Charles Edward Kiefner – Adjunct General for the State of Missouri
 Kenneth Knox, former Southeast Missouri State University football coach
 Raymond H. Littge, World War II flying ace
 John William Noell, politician
 Thomas E. Noell, politician
 John T. Richardson, priest and President of DePaul University
 Rocio Romero, designer
 Joseph Rosati, opened St. Mary's of the Barrens Catholic Churchin 1818
 Bill Schindler, Major League Baseball player
 Steven Tilley, former Speaker of the Missouri House of Representatives

References

External links
 Official website
 Chamber of Commerce
 Historic maps of Perryville in the Sanborn Maps of Missouri Collection at the University of Missouri

 
Cities in Missouri
Cities in Perry County, Missouri
County seats in Missouri
1856 establishments in Missouri